Akaiyan Falls is an ephemeral waterfall located in Glacier National Park, Montana, US.

References

Waterfalls of Glacier National Park (U.S.)